Miralda temperata is a species of sea snail, a marine gastropod mollusc in the family Pyramidellidae, the pyrams and their allies.

Distribution
This species occurs in the Atlantic Ocean off São Tomé and Principe.

References

External links
 To World Register of Marine Species

Pyramidellidae
Invertebrates of São Tomé and Príncipe
Gastropods described in 1993